Paulo Roberto Valoura Júnior (born 20 March 1986), known as Juninho Valoura or just Juninho, is a Brazilian professional footballer who plays as a defensive midfielder for América Mineiro.

Club career
Born in Rio de Janeiro, Juninho started his senior career with neighbouring Serrano in 2007. Late in the year he moved to Duque de Caxias, and went on to feature regularly for the club in the following seven seasons, only split by a loan deal at América Mineiro in 2013.

In June 2014, Juninho opted not to renew his contract with Duque and signed for Tombense. After finishing the year as a starter and champion of the Série D, he agreed to a contract with Macaé.

One of the spotlights of the 2015 Série B, Juninho signed a contract with fellow league team Bahia. An undisputed starter for the campaign, he contributed with six league goals in 33 appearances as his side returned to the main category after two years.

On 14 May 2017, Juninho made his Série A debut at the age of 31, starting in a 6–2 home routing of Atlético Paranaense.

In May 2019, he was loaned to Fortaleza from Bahia until the end of the season.

Career statistics

Honours 
Tombense
Campeonato Brasileiro Série D: 2014

Bahia
Copa do Nordeste: 2017

Ceará
Campeonato Cearense: 2018

References

External links
 

1986 births
Living people
Footballers from Rio de Janeiro (city)
Brazilian footballers
Association football midfielders
Campeonato Brasileiro Série A players
Campeonato Brasileiro Série B players
Campeonato Brasileiro Série C players
Campeonato Brasileiro Série D players
Serrano Football Club players
Duque de Caxias Futebol Clube players
América Futebol Clube (MG) players
Tombense Futebol Clube players
Macaé Esporte Futebol Clube players
Esporte Clube Bahia players
Ceará Sporting Club players
Fortaleza Esporte Clube players